Konni may refer to:
Konni (dog), Russian President Vladimir Putin's dog (1999-2014)
Konni, Kerala, a town in Kerala state in India
Konni (Hausa state), a traditional Hausa state in south central Niger
Birni-N'Konni (shortened to Konni), a town in Niger
Konni language, a Gur language spoken in Ghana
Konni Zilliacus (senior) (1855-1924), Finnish politician and writer
Konni Zilliacus (1894-1967), UK politician
 Konni, a Russian PMCs of the video game Call of Duty: Modern Warfare II in 2022

See also
Konnie Huq (b. 1975), British TV presenter
Connie (disambiguation)
Conny
Koni (disambiguation)